Jörg Wunderlich (born 19 December 1939) is a German arachnologist and palaeontologist. He is best known for his study of spiders in amber, describing over 1000 species, 300 genera, 50 tribes/subfamilies and 18 families in over 180 publications. Unlike most other arachnologists Jörg has never held any academic position and has worked as a private individual with no financial support for travel or equipment.

Personal life 
Jörg Wunderlich grew up in the east of Berlin and moved to the western part of the city with his family in 1951. The limited possibilities of schooling in the post-war period and the change to a school system with very different curricula meant that Wunderlich did not finish school until he was 20 years old. He began studying mathematics at the Free University of Berlin to become a teacher, but soon switched to biology, geography, political science and philosophy. His state examination at the university was a study of dwarf spiders at the Peacock Island in Berlin, in which he identified over 300 species of spiders, two of them new to science (Glyphesis taoplesius, Moebelia berolinensis). In 1969, Wunderlich moved to Straubenhardt, completed his pedagogy training and became a teacher at the Neuenbürg high school for 25 years (part-time for the last 15 years).

At his new place of residence in Straubenhardt, Wunderlich became a member of Alliance 90/The Greens and was in the municipal council for 10 years.

Arachnology 
Wunderlich worked autodidactically in arachnology, he had no teacher or colleague who was familiar with spiders. Otto Kraus was the first to give him advice and put him in contact with experts on literature and arachnology. Wunderlich became in personal contact with experts such as Hermann Wiehle, Wolfgang Crome, Herbert Levi, and Konrad Thaler, among others. He began his career studying spiders particularly in Linyphiidae and Theridiidae and undertook collecting trips to various countries (Australia, China, Dominican Republic, Ecuador, Gambia, Indonesia, Jordan, Malaysia, Myanmar, Peru, Singapore, USA and almost all of Europe), however he became interested in the spiders of Macaronesia. By the time he was 75 years old his interests broadened, particularly to amber spiders.

Selected publications

References 

Arachnologists
German arachnologists
1939 births
Living people